This article is a list containing lists of radio stations.

Lists of radio stations by continent 

 Africa
 Americas
 North America
 South America
 Asia
 Europe
 South Pacific and Oceania

Lists of radio stations by country 

 Australia

Lists of radio stations by language 

 Chinese
 Chinese
 German
 Indian
 Hungarian
 Irish
 Italian
 Norwegian
 Polish
 Russian

See also
List of radio broadcast networks